The HP-14 is a Richard Schreder-designed all-metal glider aircraft that was offered as a kit for homebuilding during the 1960s and 1970s. It was originally developed by retrofitting improved wings to the fuselage and tail of the HP-13, and first flew in 1966. Schreder won the 1966 US national soaring championship in the prototype HP-14.

The HP-14 features a folding V-tail and 90-degree flaps for glidepath control. The fuselage and wings are of all-aluminum riveted construction.

Development
Development of the HP-14 was carried out by several parties but the biggest modifications to the design were carried out by Slingsby Aviation at Kirkbymoorside, North Yorkshire, England, where a 20-metre wing was fitted on the prototype HP-14C, along with an enlarged V-tail. Later Slingsby production aircraft had a conventional cruciform tail. Slingsby production and sales were hampered by certification problems, particularly with flap actuation at high speed, and the disastrous fire at Kirbymoorside on 18 November 1968. Slingsby produced only three aircraft. Other homebuilders incorporated their own modifications but none achieved production status.

Variants
HP-14
Developed from a modified HP-13 fuselage, with V-tail, using the Wortmann section wings of the Schreder HP-12
HP-14C
An 18-meter span HP-14 produced by Slingsby with a conventional cruciform tail, flown by Nicholas Goodhart at the 1968 World Championships at Leszno in Poland. The initial prototype used an enlarged V-tail.
HP-14T
The HP-14 fitted with the 18-meter 'C' wing and a T-tail.
Krutchkoff SHP-1
An HP-14 with a new fuselage designed by Andre Krutchkoff.
Zauner OZ-4
Modified version with a  wingspan and a  gross weight.

Specifications (Slingsby HP-14C)

References

Schreder Designs webpage
Simons, Martin. "Slingsby Sailplanes". Shrewsbury, Airlife. 1996. 
Sailplane Directory website
Coates, Andrew. "Jane's World Sailplanes & Motor Gliders new edition". London, Jane's. 1980. 

1960s United States sailplanes
1960s British sailplanes
HP-14C
Schreder aircraft
V-tail aircraft
Aircraft first flown in 1966